Tim Mertens (born 7 February 1986 in Mechelen) is a former Belgian professional racing cyclist. He got most of his successes on the track.

Mertens retired at the end of the 2013 season, at the age of 27.

Career highlights

Track

2002
1st, National Novice Points Race Championships
2003
2nd, National Junior Individual Pursuit Championships
2004
3rd, European Junior Points Race Championships
2nd, World Junior Madison Championships
National Junior Championships
1st Track time trial
1st Individual pursuit
1st Points race
2nd, UIV U23 Cup – Ghent
2005
National Championships
1st Omnium
3rd Madison
3rd, UIV U23 Cup – Rotterdam
2006
3rd, UIV U23 Cup – Rotterdam
National Championships
1st Team pursuit
3rd Track time trial
3rd Scratch
3rd Individual pursuit
2007
1st Overall UIV U23 Cup
1st Rotterdam
1st Berlin
1st København
3rd, European Under-23 Team Pursuit Championships
3rd, Track World Cup, Scratch – Beijing
National Championships
1st Team pursuit
2nd Track time trial
2nd Scratch
2nd Omnium
2008
Track World Cup
1st Madison – Los Angeles
2nd Scratch – Manchester
2nd Scratch – Cali
1st Madison – Cali
3rd, National Derny Championships
2009
National Championships
1st Omnium
1st Scratch
1st Track time trial
1st Derny
1st Overall Track World Cup – Scratch
European Championships
4th Madison
7th Omnium
2010
1st National Scratch Championships
4th World Madison Championships
4th European Madison Championships

Road

2001
2nd, National Novice Road Race Championships
2004
2nd Overall Keizer der Juniores Koksijde
1st Stage 3
2010
8th Rund um Köln

References

External links

1986 births
Living people
Belgian male cyclists
Belgian track cyclists
Sportspeople from Mechelen
Cyclists from Antwerp Province